Naglfar is a Swedish melodic black metal band formed in 1992. The group was formed by Jens Rydén and Kristoffer Olivius, originally under the name Uninterred.

History
Naglfar formed in 1992. The band was originally called Uninterred, and was founded by Jens Rydén on vocals and guitar, and Kristoffer Olivius on bass. The band had its first full line-up when Ulf Andersson from Nocturnal Rites joined the band to play drums, and Morgan Hansson and Fredrik Degerström joined on guitar. With this new line-up Rydén could concentrate on vocals. In March 1994, Degerström left Naglfar, due to personal issues with the band as well as musical differences. Soon afterward Andersson left the band to concentrate on Nocturnal Rites. It was during this period that the band wrote and recorded their first demo in Garageland Studio, titled Stellae Trajectio. The demo was released in November 1994. Before it was publicly released, however, the band officially changed their name to Naglfar, the name deriving from a ship in Norse mythology made from the nails of the dead.

In early 1995, the band was signed by Wrong Again Records, and that summer they released their debut album, Vittra, which featured new drummer Mattias Holmgren. After the recording was over, Holmgren left the band. Other than appearing on an Iron Maiden tribute CD (performing the song "The Evil That Men Do"), the band was relatively inactive for the next few years. Their second album was titled Diabolical and released in 1998, now with Mattias Grahn on drums. CMJ New Music Report described it as a "ferocious version of Swedish black/death metal...monumentally mindblowing". The band signed to Century Media in 2002. After more line-up changes, and a European tour with Deicide, Naglfar recorded an EP called Ex Inferis, which saw the band compared to Dimmu Borgir, and an album, Sheol, which saw The New York Times describe the band as "one of the most compelling metal bands" and also "one of the most ridiculous", with the music described as "terrific". Rydén left the band after the album's release, with bassist Olivius taking over on lead vocals. Rydén went on to record under the name Profundi, recording the album The Omega Rising in 2006.

In 2005, the album Pariah was released, with AllMusic commenting on its "shockingly profane lyrics". The album was followed by a  successful tour together with Dark Funeral across Europe, as well as several festival dates. In December 2005, touring bassist Peter Morgan Lie was confirmed as the new bass player for the band. For their 2007 album Harvest,  the band worked with director Roger Johansson on a video for the track "The Darkest Road". The band also toured the US in 2007.

In August 2009, the band announced on their Myspace page that they were about to begin recording the new album, without mentioning any planned date for release. In December 2011, Naglfar launched their official Facebook page. On 22 December 2011 a new album, entitled Téras, was announced. It was released in March 2012. Dirk Verbeuren appears on the album as a session musician. In 2013, Naglfar performed at Wacken Open Air, Europe's biggest open-air heavy metal festival.

The band started writing its seventh album in February 2014. In 2020, the band confirmed that their album will be titled Cerecloth. The album was released on May, 8, through Century Media.

Members

Current
 Kristoffer "Wrath" Olivius – bass (1992–2005), lead vocals (2005–present)
 Andreas Nilsson – guitars (1993–present)
 Marcus "Vargher" Norman – guitars, bass, keyboard (2000–present)

Former
 Ulf Andersson – drums, percussion (1992–1994)
 Fredrik Degerström – guitars (1993–1994)
 Mattias Holmgren – drums, percussion (1995)
 Morgan Hansson – guitar (1993–2000)
 Jens Rydén – lead vocals, keyboard (1992–2005), guitars (1992–1993)
 Mattias Grahn – drums, percussion (1997–2011)
 Morgan Lie – drums, percussion (1995–1997), bass (2005–2011)

Session/touring
 Dirk Verbeuren – session drums (2011–present)
 Alex 'Impaler' Friberg - live bass (2012-present)
 Efraim Juntunen - live drums (2012-present)

Timeline

Discography

Studio albums
 Vittra (1995) – remastered edition (2002), Regain
 Diabolical (1998), Regain
 Sheol (2003), Century Media
 Pariah (2005), Century Media/EMI
 Harvest (2007), Century Media – limited edition with DVD (2011), Century Media/EMI
 Téras (2012), Century Media
 Cerecloth (2020), Century Media

Compilations
Pariah + Harvest (2008), Century Media – box set

EPs
 When Autumn Storms Come (1998)
 Ex Inferis (2002), Century Media
 An Extension of His Arm and Will (2012), Century Media

Demos
 Stellae Trajectio (1994)
 We Are Naglfar – Fuck You! (1995)
 Maiden Slaughter (1996)

References

External links 

 
 

Swedish black metal musical groups
Swedish melodic death metal musical groups
Blackened death metal musical groups
Musical groups established in 1992
Century Media Records artists